Sinobaca  is a genus of bacteria from the family of Bacillaceae with one known species (Sinobaca qinghaiensis).

References

Bacillaceae
Bacteria genera
Monotypic bacteria genera
Taxa described in 2008